Baek Kyu-jung (born 15 October 1995), also known as Q Baek, is a South Korean professional golfer.

As an amateur, Baek played on the winning South Korean team in the Espirito Santo Trophy in 2012 alongside Kim Hyo-joo and Kim Min-sun.

Baek turned professional on 16 October 2012 and plays on the LPGA of Korea Tour (KLPGA). She won four events in her rookie year (2014). One of the events was the LPGA KEB-HanaBank Championship, a tournament co-sanctioned by the LPGA Tour. She later accepted membership on the LPGA Tour for 2015.

Professional wins (4)

LPGA of Korea Tour wins (4)

Events in bold are KLPGA majors.
1 Co-sanctioned with LPGA Tour

LPGA Tour wins (1)

1 Co-sanctioned with KLPGA Tour

LPGA Tour playoff record (1–0)

Results in LPGA majors

CUT = missed the half-way cut
T = tied

Team appearances
Amateur
Espirito Santo Trophy (representing South Korea): 2012 (winners)

References

External links
Baek Kyu-jung at the KLPGA Tour official site 

Seoul Sisters profile

South Korean female golfers
LPGA of Korea Tour golfers
LPGA Tour golfers
People from Gumi, North Gyeongsang
1995 births
Living people